The Feng Bao 1, also known as FB-1, was a Chinese carrier rocket launched between 1972 and 1981. It was replaced by the nearly identical Long March 2, which had been developed at the same time for political reasons related to China's Cultural Revolution.

The Feng Bao was derived from the DF-5 missile. Eleven were launched, of which four failed. Launches occurred from LA-2B at the Jiuquan Satellite Launch Centre.

Launch history

See also
List of Long March rocket launches

References

Space launch vehicles of China
Vehicles introduced in 1972